NA-207 Nawabshah-I is a constituency for the National Assembly of Pakistan.

Election 2002 

General elections were held on 10 Oct 2002. Dr. Azra Fazal Pechuho of PPP won by 75,237 votes.

Election 2008 

General elections were held on 18 Feb 2008. Dr. Azra Fazal Pechuho of PPP won by 108,404 votes.

Election 2013 

General elections were held on 11 May 2013. Dr. Azra Fazal Pechuho of PPP won by 113,199 votes and became the  member of National Assembly.

Election 2018 

General elections are scheduled to be held on 25 July 2018.

See also
NA-206 Naushahro Feroze-II
NA-208 Nawabshah-II

References

External links 
Election result's official website

NA-213